Orlando Rubén Yáñez Alabart (born 12 October 1993), known as Rubén Yáñez, is a Spanish professional footballer who plays for Málaga CF  as a goalkeeper.

Club career

Real Madrid
Born in Blanes, Girona, Catalonia, Yáñez joined Real Madrid's youth academy from local side Girona FC in 2010, aged 17. He made his senior debut in the 2012–13 season, playing 26 games for the C-team in Segunda División B. In July 2013, Yáñez was promoted to the reserves, in Segunda División.

On 8 September 2013, Yáñez made his professional debut, starting in a 0–1 home loss against CD Mirandés. Mainly a backup to Fernando Pacheco during the campaign, he appeared in four matches as his side suffered relegation.

After Pacheco's promotion to the main squad, Yáñez was an undisputed starter for the reserves in 2014–15, contributing with 30 appearances. On 5 August 2015 he was promoted to the first team by new manager Rafael Benítez, and made his debut four days later, coming on as a late substitute for Kiko Casilla in a 0–0 friendly draw against Vålerenga Fotball.

Yáñez was the third option behind Keylor Navas and Casilla when the team won the 2015–16 UEFA Champions League. He did not make an appearance during the season when Madrid won the 2016–17 La Liga and the 2016–17 UEFA Champions League. With 21 total appearances on the substitute bench across two years, he only played one official match for Real Madrid on 30 November 2016, again as a late substitute for Casilla in the last 15 minutes of an eventual 6–1 win (13–2 aggregate) against Cultural Leonesa in the Round of 32 of Copa del Rey.

Getafe
On 17 August 2017, Yáñez signed a four-year deal with Getafe CF, being immediately loaned to Cádiz CF for one year. He made only six appearances during his time in Andalusia, all in the Copa del Rey.

On 22 August 2019, after spending the whole 2018–19 season as a third-choice, Yáñez joined SD Huesca on a one-year loan deal. He contributed with eight appearances overall for the side, acting as a backup to Álvaro Fernández as his side achieved promotion to the top tier as champions.

Yáñez finally made his debut for Getafe on 17 December 2020 in a 2–1 win at CD Anaitasuna in the first round of the cup. Three days later he made his La Liga bow in a 2–0 win at former club Cádiz, to finally play in the top flight at the age of 26. After ten consecutive games in all competitions – including once David Soria had returned from injury – he lost his place to him in February.

On 15 July 2022, Yáñez terminated his contract with Getafe.

Málaga
On 15 July 2022, hours after leaving Getafe, Yáñez signed a three-year deal with Málaga CF in the second division. Second-choice to Manolo Reina, he made his debut on 3 November in the 14th game of the season, a 2–1 loss at FC Cartagena.

Career statistics

Club

Honours
Real Madrid
La Liga: 2016–17
UEFA Super Cup: 2016
FIFA Club World Cup: 2016
UEFA Champions League: 2016–17

Huesca
Segunda División: 2019–20

References

External links
Real Madrid official profile

1993 births
Living people
People from Selva
Sportspeople from the Province of Girona
Spanish footballers
Footballers from Catalonia
Association football goalkeepers
La Liga players
Segunda División players
Segunda División B players
Real Madrid C footballers
Real Madrid Castilla footballers
Real Madrid CF players
Getafe CF footballers
Cádiz CF players
SD Huesca footballers
Málaga CF players
UEFA Champions League winning players
Spain youth international footballers